The 1912 Fitzgibbon Cup was the first staging of the Fitzgibbon Cup since its establishment by the Gaelic Athletic Association. The draw for the group stage fixtures took place at University College Cork on 10 January 1912. University College Dublin hosted the cup at Jones' Road from 26 April to 28 April 1912.

On 18 April 1912, University College Dublin won the Fitzgibbon Cup after topping the group with four points after recording two wins. University College Cork were second.

Statistics

Group table

Group results

References

Fitzgibbon
Fitzgibbon Cup